British Waterways, often shortened to BW, was a statutory corporation wholly owned by the government of the United Kingdom.  It served as the navigation authority for the majority of canals and a number of rivers and docks in England, Scotland and Wales.

On 2 July 2012, all of British Waterways' assets and responsibilities in England and Wales were transferred to the newly founded charity the Canal & River Trust. In Scotland, British Waterways continues to operate as a standalone public corporation under the trading name Scottish Canals.

The British Waterways Board was initially established as a result of the Transport Act 1962 and took control of the inland waterways assets of the British Transport Commission in 1963. By the final years of its existence, British Waterways was sponsored by the Department for Environment, Food and Rural Affairs (DEFRA) in England and Wales, and by the Scottish Government in Scotland.

British Waterways managed and maintained  of canals, rivers and docks within the United Kingdom including the buildings, structures and landscapes alongside these waterways. Half of the United Kingdom population lives within five miles of a canal or river once managed by British Waterways. In addition to the watercourses, British Waterways also cared for and owned 2,555 listed structures including seventy scheduled monuments. A further 800 areas have special designation and a further hundred are Sites of Special Scientific Interest (SSSIs).

Through its charitable arm The Waterways Trust, British Waterways maintained a museum of its history at the National Waterways Museum's three sites at Gloucester Docks, Stoke Bruerne and Ellesmere Port. Since the transfer of the assets and responsibilities of British Waterways to the Canal & River Trust, The Waterways Trust in England and Wales has merged with the Canal & River Trust. It continues, however, as an independent charity in Scotland.

History

Formation
During the early 20th century, the canal network was in decline because of increasing competition from the railways and road transport. Until the 1950s, freight and other cargo was still carried on the canals, by then owned by the railway companies. When the railways were nationalised in 1948, the canals they owned were also incorporated into the new British Transport Commission. The Commission focused on encouraging commercial traffic to the waterways, but with the construction of motorways in the 1950s, and legislation such as the Clean Air Act 1956 affecting the coal carriers using the waterways, that policy could not be sustained. The last regular coal long-distance narrow-boat-carrying contract, from Atherstone to the Kearley and Tonge jam factory at Southall near London, ended in October 1970, although lime juice continued to be carried by narrow boat from Brentford to Boxmoor until 1981, and aggregate from Thurmaston to Syston from 1976 until 1988.

Under the Transport Act 1962, the British Transport Commission was split into several new organisations, including the British Railways Board and the London Transport Board, with the inland waterways of Britain becoming part of the new British Waterways Board (BWB).

In the same year, a remarkably harsh winter saw many boats frozen into their moorings, unable to move for weeks at a time. That was one of the reasons given for the decision by the BWB to formally cease most of its commercial narrow boat traffic on the canals. By that time, the canal network had shrunk to just , half the size it was at its peak in the early 19th century. However, the basic network was still intact, with many of the closures affecting duplicate routes or branches.

Transport Act 1968 
The Transport Act 1968 classified the nationalised waterways into three distinct categories as specified by BWB:

 Commercial – Waterways that could still support commercial traffic; these were mainly located in the North East of England
 Cruising – Waterways that had a potential for leisure use, such as cruising, fishing and recreational use
 Remainder – Waterways for which no potential commercial or leisure use could be seen.

British Waterways Board was required under the Act to keep commercial and cruising waterways fit for their respective traffic and use. However, these obligations were subject to the caveat of being by the most economical means and BWB had no requirement to maintain remainder waterways or keep them in a navigable condition. As a result, many remainder waterways could face abandonment or transference to the local authority who would contribute to the waterway's upkeep as part of the act. Additionally, many of these remainder waterways were crossed by new roads and motorways without provision for boat navigation.

Late 20th century
As the century progressed, leisure boating on the canals began to expand, with numbers reaching 20,000 by the early 1980s. Additionally, the work of voluntary restoration groups succeeded in restoring some waterways to their former condition. However, despite this steady progress throughout the 1970s and 1980s, organisations such as English Heritage criticised the newly named British Waterways for failing to provide "adequate training or access to professional advice [for British Waterways officers] on the conservation of historic structures".

However, by the late 1990s the canal network and British Waterways were flourishing; revenues generated for canal maintenance reached £100 million for the first time in 1998, large grants from the Heritage Lottery Fund allowed the canal network to expand again by restoring former canals and additional funding was announced for British Waterways in 1999 by the then Deputy Prime Minister John Prescott. By the early 2000s, boating numbers had overtaken the previous industrial revolution high and the canal network was officially classed as 'safe' following the completion of all outstanding safety works.

Abolition
By 2009, British Waterways was looking for a means of gaining a larger and more secure supply of funding in order to plug a £30m shortfall in its budget, while utilising the potential for volunteers on the waterways, allowing the waterways community to play a greater role. Its plans involved moving to become a charitable trust, in charge of the current canal systems in addition to acquiring other waterways, such as those operated by the Environment Agency.

In March 2010, the plans were given a boost when the government announced in the Budget that it intended to turn BW into a mutual organisation, but no further details were released. BW welcomed the announcement, with the chairman Tony Hales stating that the plan would preserve the canals and their associated infrastructure, and "safeguard against a return to the decline and dereliction which they faced in the last century". It would also "unlock the enormous public support that there is for them."

By September of the same year, the proposals seemed likely to be enacted; a leaked list of quangos that were due to be abolished was acquired by the BBC, including British Waterways, with the note: "Abolish as a non-departmental public body and mutualise".

The new name, the Canal & River Trust, and logo were revealed in October 2011, and the trust was granted charitable status on 5 April 2012. On 2 July 2012 all of British Waterways' responsibilities for waterways in England and Wales were transferred to the Canal & River Trust. The Scottish Government, however, decided that the waterways in Scotland would not be part of the new charity, and that British Waterways Scotland would remain a state-owned entity, operating as Scottish Canals.

Organisation

British Waterways operated from headquarters in Watford, with additional administrative offices in Leeds and thirteen regional waterway offices.

At the strategic level, there were ten non-executive board members, who were led by the chairman (in the final phase of operations, Tony Hales), and appointed by the Secretary of State for Environment, Food and Rural Affairs and the Scottish Government (eight by the former and two by the latter). In addition, there were nine executive directors led by Robin Evans, the Chief Executive.

At a regional level, British Waterways was divided into thirteen regional waterways; each appointed a waterways manager. These regions were: 
Scotland (Highlands)
Scotland (Lowlands)
North West Waterways
North East Waterways
Manchester and Pennine Waterways
North Wales and Borders Waterways
West Midlands Waterways
Central Shires Waterways
East Midlands Waterways
South Wales and Severn Waterways
South East Waterways
Kennet and Avon Waterways
London Waterways

Finance
British Waterways was funded through a mixture of commercial activities, government grants and grants and donations from charitable bodies. In 2010/11, BW raised over £103.6 million from their commercial activities, including waterways licensing, received £58.9 million from a government grant, issued via the Department for Environment, Food and Rural Affairs, and gained a further £14 million through third party contributions. However, operating revenue for the company was at a deficit of £3.7 million, a result of a large cut of 16 per cent in the government grant given to BW, and through the continuing programme of renovation and works costing £92.1 million.

British Waterways owned a large canalside property portfolio which made a considerable contribution to the funding of the waterway network. This amounted to £130m in the five years prior to 2008. As of 2008, a HM Treasury team was reviewing the management of this portfolio in terms of public sector savings and efficiencies. Another source of revenue contemplated by BW in October 2008 was the installation of 50 wind turbines on waterside land, generating around 100 megawatts.

Waterscape
As part of British Waterways' commitment to promote the canals to users other than boaters, BW set up the Waterscape website in 2003 to be an official information and leisure resource for UK inland waterways. The website worked alongside the Environment Agency and the Broads Authority and covered all canals, rivers and waterways in England, Scotland and Wales.

The Waterscape website was taken down on 3 July 2012 and was replaced by the new website of the Canal & River Trust.

Waterways operated
The following waterways and dockland were under British Waterways' ownership and care:

 Aire and Calder Navigation
 River Aire
 Ashby Canal
 Ashton Canal
 Birmingham Canal Navigations
 Birmingham and Fazeley Canal
 Bow Back Rivers
 Bridgwater and Taunton Canal
 Calder and Hebble Navigation
 Caldon Canal
 Caledonian Canal
 Chesterfield Canal
 Coventry Canal
 Crinan Canal
 Cromford Canal
 Droitwich Barge Canal and Droitwich Junction Canal
 Erewash Canal
 Forth and Clyde Canal
 Foss Dyke
 Gloucester and Sharpness Canal
 Grand Union Canal
 Grantham Canal
 Hertford Union Canal
 Huddersfield Broad Canal
 Huddersfield Narrow Canal
 Kennet and Avon Canal
 Lancaster Canal
 River Lee
 Leeds and Liverpool Canal, including Liverpool Canal Link
 Liverpool Docks (south of Pier Head only)
 Limehouse Cut
 Llangollen Canal
 Macclesfield Canal
 Manchester Bolton & Bury Canal
 Millwall Dock
 Monkland Canal (not navigable)
 Monmouthshire and Brecon Canal
 Montgomery Canal
 New Junction Canal
 Nottingham Canal
 River Ouse
 Peak Forest Canal
 Pocklington Canal
 Oxford Canal
 Regent's Canal
 Ribble Link
 Ripon Canal
 Rochdale Canal
 St. Helens Canal (not navigable)
 Selby Canal
 River Severn
 Sheffield and South Yorkshire Navigation
 Sheffield and Tinsley Canal
 Shropshire Union Canal, including Middlewich Branch and Shrewsbury Canal
 River Soar
 Staffordshire and Worcestershire Canal
 Stainforth and Keadby Canal
 River Stort
 Stourbridge Canal
 Stratford-upon-Avon Canal
 Swansea Canal
 Tame Valley Canal
 Tees Navigation and Barrage
 River Trent (navigation authority of a section only; the navigation authority of the rest is Associated British Ports)
 Trent and Mersey Canal
 Union Canal
 Ure Navigation
 River Weaver
 West India Docks
 River Witham
 Worcester and Birmingham Canal
 Wyrley and Essington Canal

Other inland waterways in Britain
The Environment Agency is the navigation authority for the non-tidal River Thames, rivers in the Fens and East Anglia and some other waterways. The Port of London Authority is that for the tidal section of the Thames.  The Broads Authority is the navigation authority for the Norfolk Broads. The Manchester Ship Canal, Bridgewater Canal, Basingstoke Canal, Cam and Chelmer and Blackwater Navigation were managed by other authorities.

See also

Canal & River Trust
Canals of the United Kingdom
History of the British canal system
List of navigation authorities in the United Kingdom
List of rivers of the United Kingdom
Narrowboat
World Canals Conference
Thames21

References

External links
British Waterways website – corporate information, document downloads (archive)
Association of Inland Navigation Authorities (AINA)

Water transport in the United Kingdom
Former nationalised industries of the United Kingdom
Waterways organisations in the United Kingdom
British Transport Commission
1962 establishments in the United Kingdom
2012 disestablishments in the United Kingdom
Department for Environment, Food and Rural Affairs
Inland waterway authorities
Defunct transport organisations based in the United Kingdom